James Howard Bray (December 12, 1898 – July, 1931) was an American Negro league catcher in the 1920s and 1930s.

A native of Troy, Alabama, Bray made his Negro leagues debut with the Chicago American Giants in 1925. He spent several seasons with the team, and played on Chicago's 1927 Colored World Series championship squad. Bray died in 1931 at age 32 as a result of a fight with teammate John Hines.

References

External links
 and Seamheads

1898 births
1931 deaths
Chicago American Giants players
20th-century African-American sportspeople
Baseball catchers